Kate Duval Hughes (born June 15, 1837) was an American author and inventor.

Early life and family
Hughes was born in Philadelphia, Pennsylvania on June 15, 1837.   Her father, French-born Peter Stephen Duval, owned a large lithographic firm in Philadelphia. Her brother was Stephen C. Duval.

Hughes married, but the marriage ended in divorce.  At the same, the family fortune was lost.  She then spent several years Europe before moving Washington, D. C.  She took a job with a federal agency.   She never remarried, instead concentrated on her career and her writing.

Career

Hughes invented two Combined Window Sash Fasteners and Holders, receiving patents on both of them. Using her inventions, a home owner could lower and raise the upper and lower sashes of their windows to a limited extent, increasing home security. 

In 1890 Hughes discovered how to extract the essential oil of frankincense.  She  incorporated this oil into an ointment for skin diseases, which was used in many hospitals.

Writings
Huges wrote four books for younger readers: Little Pearls (New York, 1876), The Mysterious Castle (Baltimore, 1878), The Fair Maid of Connaught (New York, 1889) and Legends and Tales of the Sierras (1888)

A devout Roman Catholic, Hughes' books had religious themes. Cardinal James Gibbons praised her works.

References

1837 births
19th-century American inventors
American women writers
Year of death missing
People from Philadelphia
Women inventors
Wikipedia articles incorporating text from A Woman of the Century